Jhuna was a fine sheer fabric, an open-weave structure similar to gauze. Jhuna was used primarily in the dresses of the dancers.

Name 
Jhuna is a derivation word of   That means fine and thin.

Dimensions 
Jhuna was produced in pieces with the dimensions, 20 yards of length, and one-yard width.

Exports 
Unlike other muslins, exports of Jhuna were forbidden.

Use 
Jhuna was purposefully produced for the use of wealthy women households as well as the clothing of dancers and singers.

See also 

 Mulboos khas

References 

Woven fabrics